The 2015 GCI Great Alaska Shootout was the 37th Great Alaska Shootout, the annual college basketball tournament in Anchorage, Alaska that featured colleges from all over the United States. The event took place from November 25 through November 28, 2015, with eight colleges and universities participating in the men's tournament and four universities participating in the women's tournament. Most of the games in the men's tournament are televised on the CBS Sports Network.

Brackets

Men's

Women's

References

Great Alaska Shootout
Great Alaska Shootout
Great Alaska Shootout
2015 in sports in Alaska
November 2015 sports events in the United States